is a Japanese manga series written and illustrated by Daisaku Tsuru. It was serialized in Shogakukan's seinen manga magazine Big Comic Superior from December 2013 to January 2018, with its chapters collected in six tankōbon volumes.

Publication
Written and illustrated by Daisaku Tsuru, Mushinuyun was serialized in Shogakukan's seinen manga magazine Big Comic Superior from December 13, 2013, to January 12, 2018. Shogakukan collected its chapters in six tankōbon volumes, released from July 30, 2014, to January 30, 2018.

Volume list

Reception
Mushinuyun was one of the Jury Recommended Works at the 18th Japan Media Arts Festival in 2014. The series ranked #5 on "The Best Manga 2015 Kono Manga wo Yome!" ranking by Freestyle magazine. It was nominated for the Sugoi Japan Award in 2017.

References

Further reading

External links
 

Science fiction anime and manga
Seinen manga
Shogakukan manga